Charles Gilman Norris (April 23, 1881 – July 25, 1945) was an American novelist. A native of Chicago, Norris worked as a journalist for some years before finding success as a novelist and playwright. His first book was The Amateur (1916). His other novels include Salt (1919), Brass: A Novel of Marriage (1921), Bread (1923), Pig Iron (1926), Seed: A Novel of Birth Control (1930), Zest (1933), Hands (1935), and Flint (1944). He also published three plays: The Rout of the Philistines (with Nino Marcelli, 1922), A Gest of Robin Hood (with Robert C. Newell, 1929), and Ivanhoe: A Grove Play (1936).

Critiques of his work 
Norris was well-respected by his literary peers. In a letter to Alida Bigelow dated September 23, 1919, F. Scott Fitzgerald advised the young woman to "read "Salt" young girl so that you may know what life B." (spelling is that of Fitzgerald). The Oxford Companion to American Literature notes that Norris' novels dealt with "such problems as modern education, women in business, hereditary and environmental influences, big business, ethics and birth control."

Family 
He was the brother of novelist Frank Norris and the husband of author Kathleen Norris. His granddaughter Kathleen Norris (San Francisco 1 Mar 1935–San Francisco 8 Dec 1967) was a wife of Prince Andrew Romanov (b.London 21 Jan 1923).

Novels and short stories

 
 
 
 Marriage; Short Stories of Married life by American Writers, Tarkington, Cutting, Hergesheimer, Miller, Street, Delano, Norris, Gale, Harrison, Kelland, Hopper, Adams, Butler, Foster, Hughes, Dreiser, Cooper, Turner, Webster, Lincoln. Garden City, N. Y.,: Doubleday Page, 1923.
 Bread. N.Y: Dutton, 1923.
 Pig Iron. N.Y: E. P. Dutton, 1926.
 Zelda Marsh. N.Y.: E.P. Dutton, 1927.
 Seed, A Novel of Birth Control. Garden City, N.Y.,: Doubleday Doran, 1930.
 Zest. Garden City, N. Y.: Doubleday Doran, 1933.
 Hands. New York,: Farrar & Rinehart, 1935.
 Bricks Without Straw. N.Y.:  Doubleday Doran, 1938.
 Flint. Garden City, New York.: Doubleday Doran, 1944.
Books by Charles Norris in Theodore Dreiser's library
John Rossiter's Wife

Plays

 
 Norris, Charles Gilman, Robert C. Newell, and Bohemian Club. A Gest of Robin Hood. San Francisco,: Bohemian Club, 1929.
 Norris, Charles Gilman, Walter Scott, and Calif. Bohemian Club (San Francisco). Ivanhoe: A Grove Play. San Francisco: Bohemian Club, 1936.

Works on Frank Norris

 Norris, Frank. A Deal in Wheat, and Other Stories of the New and Old West. New York,: Doubleday Page, 1903.
 Norris, Frank, and Charles Gilman Norris (introd.). The Octopus : A Story of California. Garden City, N. Y.: Doubleday Page & Co., 1924.
 Norris, Frank, and Charles Gilman Norris. The Third Circle. New York,: J. Lane Company, 1909.
 Norris, Charles Gilman. Frank Norris, 1870–1902; An Intimate Sketch of the Man who was Universally Acclaimed the Greatest American Writer of His Generation. New York,: Doubleday Page, 1914.
 Norris, Frank, Oscar Lewis, and Charles Gilman Norris. Frank Norris of "the Wave": Stories & Sketches from the San Francisco Weekly, 1893 to 1897. San Francisco,: The Westgate Press, 1931.

External links

 
 
 
 Guide to the Norris Family Papers at The Bancroft Library
 Portrait Photograph @ Online Archive of California
 

1881 births
1945 deaths
20th-century American male writers
20th-century American novelists
American male novelists
Novelists from Illinois
Writers from Chicago